HW Virginis, abbreviated HW Vir, is an eclipsing binary system (of the Algol type), approximately 563 light-years away based on the parallax measured by the Gaia spacecraft, in the constellation of Virgo.  The system comprises an eclipsing B-type subdwarf star and red dwarf star.  The two stars orbit each other every 0.116795 days.

Eclipse timing variations 

Based on variations in the timing of the system's eclipses, in 2008 it was claimed that two giant planets were in orbit around the binary, with masses of 8.47 and 19.2 times the mass of Jupiter orbiting with periods of 9.1 and 15.8 years respectively. The proposed system was later shown to be extremely unstable, with mean lifetimes less than 1000 years in the parameter space allowed by the uncertainties in the data. An alternate, dynamically-stable orbital solution was proposed with a 14.3 Jupiter mass object on a 12-year orbit and an outer companion of 65 Jupiter masses on a 55-year orbit, however it has been noted that the outer companion's orbital parameters are highly unconstrained, again casting doubt on the reality of this model. The problems with modelling this system and the proposed planets orbiting several other post-common envelope binaries has led to the suggestion that the eclipse timing variations used to infer the existence of planets has a non-planetary origin. The eclipse timing variations of HW Virginis were shown to be incompatible with all previous planetary system models as of 2018, and again in 2021. However, eclipse timing variations cannot be explained by known stellar mechanisms either.

See also

References

External links 
 

Algol variables
Virgo (constellation)
Virginis, HW
B-type subdwarfs
M-type main-sequence stars
062157
J12442024-0840168
-07 3477
Hypothetical planetary systems